The 2017–18 season is the 135th season in Bristol Rovers' history and their 90th in the English Football League. Rovers will compete in the third tier of English football, League One as well as three cup competitions, FA Cup, EFL Cup and EFL Trophy.

Transfers

Transfers in

Transfers out

Loans in

Loans out

Competitions

Friendlies
As of 2 June 2017, Bristol Rovers have announced thirteen pre-season friendlies against Hull City in Portugal Corinthian Casuals, Yate Town, Melksham Town, Weston-super-Mare, Mangotsfield United, Salisbury, Gloucester City, Taunton Town, Forest Green Rovers, Yeovil Town, Bath City and West Bromwich Albion.

League One

League table

Result summary

Results by matchday

Matches
On 21 June 2017, the league fixtures were announced.

FA Cup
On 16 October 2017, Bristol Rovers were away to Notts County in the first round.

EFL Cup
On 16 June 2017, Bristol Rovers were drawn at home to Cambridge United in the first round. Rovers were drawn away in the second round against Fulham. Another away tie against Wolverhampton Wanderers was confirmed for the third round.

EFL Trophy
On 12 July 2017, the group stage draw was completed with Rovers facing Swindon Town, West Ham United U23s and Wycombe Wanderers in Southern Group C.

Squad statistics
Source:

Numbers in parentheses denote appearances as substitute.
Players with squad numbers struck through and marked  left the club during the playing season.
Players with names in italics and marked * were on loan from another club for the whole of their season with Bristol Rovers.
Players listed with no appearances have been in the matchday squad but only as unused substitutes.
Key to positions: GK – Goalkeeper; DF – Defender; MF – Midfielder; FW – Forward

References

Bristol Rovers
Bristol Rovers F.C. seasons